Jimmy Gooch (11 July 1921 – 2001) was an English professional footballer who played as a goalkeeper.

Career
Born in West Ham, Gooch began his career at Becontree. He joined Preston North End as an amateur in March 1942, turning professional in May of that year. He later played for Bradford City, Watford and Bath City.

References

1921 births
2001 deaths
English footballers
Preston North End F.C. players
Bradford City A.F.C. players
Watford F.C. players
Bath City F.C. players
English Football League players
Association football goalkeepers